The X-Men are a fictional superhero team in Marvel Comics' Marvel Universe. The group debuted in 1963 in an eponymous comic book series. Beginning in 1989, the characters appeared in video game adaptations for home consoles, handheld game consoles, arcades, and personal computers. An earlier game was planned for home computers in 1985, but the developer went out of business before its launch. The first games were released on 8-bit home platforms, and the series expanded onto handheld consoles and arcades in the early 1990s. Most X-Men games, especially those released in the 2000s, were released on several platforms. Several companies have developed entries in the franchise, including Paragon Software, Software Creations, Konami, and Capcom. The titles are action games that pit the X-Men against Marvel supervillains, typically taking the form of beat 'em up and fighting games. Each game features different groupings of X-Men heroes and villains, and typically allows players to control multiple characters.

One X-Men character, Wolverine, has starred in several eponymous action games; the first game was the 1990 Wolverine. X-Men characters also frequently appear in Marvel games that focus on several of its comic book franchises, including Marvel vs. Capcom: Clash of Super Heroes and Marvel: Ultimate Alliance. The franchise holds several Guinness World Records, including most games based on a superhero group, first tag-team fighting game, first superhero first-person shooter, and most simultaneous players on an arcade game.

X-Men games

Wolverine games

Cancelled games

Related games

References

External links 

 
X-Men
Video games